Sagaren Pillay  is a retired South African Navy officer, who served as Chief Director: Maritime Strategy.

Military career

He has served a Naval Attache in Argentina, Flag Officer Commanding Naval Base Simon's Town and Director: Maritime Plans.

He retired in 2018.

Awards and decorations

References

South African admirals
South African people of Indian descent
Living people
Year of birth missing (living people)
Naval attachés
Military attachés